Hakuhō Maru (Japanese: 白鳳丸) was a Japanese deep sea trawler and survey/inspection ship that was requisitioned by the Imperial Japanese Navy during World War II and served in varying roles as a patrol boat, transport ship, cargo ship, minesweeper, and escort ship.

History
Hakuhō Maru was commissioned by the Japanese Ministry of Agriculture and Forestry (農林省). She was laid down on October 15, 1921 at the Hikoshima Shipyard of Mitsubishi Shipbuilding Co., Ltd. (三菱造船株式會社彦島造), completed on February 16, 1922 and launched on 29 March 1922. She worked primarily as a fishery enforcement, inspection, and survey ship in the Sea of Okhotsk, the Kurile Islands, the Bering Sea, and the North Pacific. On 2 November 1941, she was requisitioned by the Imperial Japanese Navy and assigned to the Fifth Fleet (Northern Area Force) as part of the 13th Minesweeper Division under Captain Toshio Mitsuka (along with Kaihō Maru and Shunkotsu Maru). The unit was part of the Kiska invasion force under Captain Takeji Ono during the Aleutian Islands campaign. On 14 July 1945, while sailing on patrol from Kushiro to Hakodate, she was engaged by ten aircraft and received 6 direct hits. Heavily damaged, she was grounded and abandoned.

References

1922 ships
Auxiliary ships of the Imperial Japanese Navy
Ships of the Aleutian Islands campaign
Maritime incidents in July 1945
Ships sunk by US aircraft